WPP AUNZ is a multinational communications, advertising, public relations, technology, and commerce holding company headquartered in Australia. It is a subsidiary of the UK conglomerate WPP plc.

It was formed after a merger between WPP and the STW Group in 2016.

Subsidiaries 
WPP Government & Public Sector Practice, which owns and controls Hawker Britton, and Barton Deakin.

References 

Australian companies established in 2016
WPP plc